Hideo Fujimoto (藤本 英男, born June 24, 1944) is a retired Greco-Roman wrestler from Japan. He competed at the 1968 and 1972 Olympics and won a silver medal in 1968, placing fourth in 1972. At the world championships he won a gold medal in 1970 and bronze medals in 1967 and 1971.

References

External links
 

1944 births
Living people
Olympic wrestlers of Japan
Wrestlers at the 1968 Summer Olympics
Wrestlers at the 1972 Summer Olympics
Japanese male sport wrestlers
Olympic silver medalists for Japan
Olympic medalists in wrestling
Medalists at the 1968 Summer Olympics
20th-century Japanese people
21st-century Japanese people